Bobby Rivers is an American television, radio personality and actor.  Rivers was the host of the now-defunct Top 5 show on the Food Network, and Watch Bobby Rivers, a critically acclaimed prime-time celebrity talk show on VH1. He blazed trails to achieve the first in many things on television for African Americans.

Early life and career
Rivers, who grew up in South Central Los Angeles during the tumultuous 1960's, graduated from Marquette University in Wisconsin.  Rivers' first television appearance was on a 1970 syndicated classic film trivia game show. He was a high school student. During those times on "The Movie Game", shot in Hollywood, he was the program's first African-American contestant and its youngest winner.  After working in Milwaukee radio, he made his professional television debut in 1979 on Milwaukee's ABC affiliate, WISN-TV, as the city's first African-American film critic on TV. He did this as a contributor on Milwaukee's edition of "PM Magazine", a syndicated show that had such national hosts as Matt Lauer, Mary Hart and Leeza Gibbons. During that time, he was tapped to audition as a possible movie critic replacement when Gene Siskel and Roger Ebert left Chicago PBS for Disney syndication. In 1984, he'd moved up to co-host and associate producer of a live weekday show on WISN.

Career continued
After that show was cancelled in 1985, Rivers was offered a job as an entertainment reporter for WPIX-TV New York City. Then in 1987, he was hired as a VJ by the American cable television channel VH1.  Executives there utilized his comedic and interview skills which led to his own show on the network the following year called Watch Bobby Rivers. Stephen Holden of The New York Times called him "...a master interviewer with a gift for banter." On VH1, he interviewed Paul McCartney, Kirk Douglas, Meryl Streep, Mel Gibson, Carlos Santana, Raúl Juliá, Michael Caine, Mel Blanc, Jodie Foster, Liza Minnelli, Marlo Thomas, and Norman Mailer, among others. He hosted veejay segments with the network's new addition, Rosie O'Donnell until 1990.

Rivers hosted two short-lived syndicated game shows, one called "Bedroom Buddies". In 1992, he was approached to be a lifestyles and entertainment reporter on local WNBC TV's "Weekend Today in New York" and WNYW-TV's "Good Day New York."  For the latter, he was hired as a replacement for Australian personality Gordon Elliott who had left. Rivers has performed onstage, and appeared on the television show The Sopranos.  In 2000, he was the Entertainment Editor on "Lifetime Live", an ABC News/Lifetime TV weekday magazine hour. He also worked on camera with its hosts, Deborah Roberts and the late Dana Reeve. After the cancellation of "Lifetime Live" he hosted Food Network's "Top 5" in 2002. Production ended in 2004 but the show aired in weekly repeats until 2008.

Whoopi Goldberg, a one-time guest on Rivers' VH1 talk show, picked him to be the weekly film critic/entertainment reporter on her national weekday morning show for Premiere Radio, "Wake Up With Whoopi". The show lasted from 2006 to 2008. Director Steven Soderbergh use footage of Rivers' VH1 interview of Spalding Gray in his documentary on the late monologist/actor. The 2010 release was entitled "And Everything Is Going Fine".  Rivers moved into comedic acting playing "Professor Robert Haige" in "'In The Know'", a satirical round-table news segment in The Onion News Network video podcast.

Since 2011, he has written a blog about television and films; "Bobby Rivers TV."

References

External links
Homepage

The Onion

Living people
Male actors from Los Angeles
African-American people
Television personalities from Los Angeles
American radio personalities
Year of birth missing (living people)
VH1 people